Saga of the Noble Dead (also known as The Noble Dead Series) written by Barb Hendee and J. C. Hendee is a set of chronological books in series, and chronological series in a saga that tells the story of protagonists drawn together in a struggle against the little-known and little believed-in Noble Dead (higher undead such as vampires) that herald the return of a long forgotten age in a fantasy world. It begins with an unlikely trio drawn together as charlatans who use their skills to cheat peasants by the common superstitions concerning the undead.  Soon enough they find that not all superstitions are completely false; the bits of truth they hold could lead to something far worse that has been long forgotten.

Series

Series 1
Composed of six novels, it tells the story of Magiere (a dhampir: a vampire/human hybrid), Leesil (a half-elf, an elf/human hybrid, with a dark past), and Chap (an elemental Fay born into the body of a majay-hì, elven hounds of a wolf lineage).  In Series 1, Book 1, S1B2: Dhampir, Magiere is unaware of her inner nature, the discovery of which leads the trio into a tangled path that uncovers hints of the Forgotten History and of what may be coming by the end of Series 1.

At the start of the story, the two "half-breeds", together with Chap, make a reasonable living pretending to be 'vampire-hunters'.  Eventually the inevitable happens; they cross paths with genuine vampires, one form of the Noble Dead or highest form[s] of the undead.  These charlatans are  plunged unwillingly into a dark reality of true undead and into their own dark fates as well as other personal secrets they kept hidden (even from each other).  Much as they want nothing to do with this, and only to settle down somewhere quiet, they are soon driven from their home on a quest to learn the truth of their pasts and why they've been drawn together.  The answers are bigger than any of them wish to acknowledge, aside from a wandering nobleman named Welstiel Massing who shadows their movements and is always too eager to goad Magiere out of hiding and force her onward.

Series 2 
Comprising three novels, it centers on a new trio composed of two secondary characters from Series/Phase 1 and one new character: Wynn Hygeorht (the young journeyer "sage"), Chane Andraso (a "young" vampire obsessed with Wynn), and a two-year-old majay-hì named Shade (daughter of Chap, from series/phase 1, and Lily, a wild majay-hì female). This series also introduces readers to the second (spiritual) form of the three major forms of Noble Dead, the first being the vampire (physical) form as encountered previously. Book 1 of this series begins about a year after the end of Series/Phase 1 on a different continent in the city of Calm Seatt, royal city of the nation of Malournè and home to the founding branch of the Guild of Sagecraft.

Wynn has returned to her guild branch, escorted to the city limits by Magiere, Leesil, and Chap.  There they part ways as the central trio of Series/Phase 1 heads off on their own secret purpose, leaving their young sage friend behind along with a treasure of recovered ancient texts likely penned by long forgotten undead.  But upon Wynn's arrival at guild, both the texts and her travel journals are seized and locked away, for the guild leaders do not want what they contain to become public knowledge.  To make matters worse, without the proof of her journals no one believes her tales of the undead, for such things are unknown in her part of the world.

Wynn sets out to recover the texts and her journals in the hope of uncovering why a mythical war of a past age left humanity with an unknown Forgotten History.  For those texts were written by long gone Noble Dead from the time of that war, a war which might come again. But she does so under the protection of two who are innate enemies and have followed her from across the world: Chane Andraso, a vampire, and Shade, a very young majay-hì whose kind are known to hunt and eradicate the undead.

To complicate matters all the more, something is hunting Wynn as well.  It wants the answers she seeks before she can get to them.  And it is not seeking that knowledge just for itself.

Series 3
Wynn is reunited with Magiere and Leesil and Chap, and other old characters of note return as well. The notion of who is an enemy or an ally becomes more complicated, for the number of those around Magiere seeking to stop a coming conflict and the return of a thousand year old adversary has grown... and not to her liking.

Spin-off: Mist-Torn Witches

Novels
Noble Dead Saga
Series/Phase 1
 S1B1: Dhampir (2003)
 S1B2: Thief of Lives (2004)
 S1B3: Sister of the Dead (2005)
 S1B4: Traitor to the Blood (2006)
 S1B5: Rebel Fay (2007)
 S1B6: Child of a Dead God (2008)
 
Series/Phase 2
 S2B1: In Shade and Shadow (2009)
 S2B2: Through Stone and Sea (2010)
 S2B3: Of Truth and Beasts (2011)

Series/Phase 3
 S3B1: Between Their Worlds (2012)
 S3B2: The Dog in the Dark (2012)
 S3B3: A Wind in the Night (2014)
 S3B4: First and Last Sorcerer (2015)
 S3B5: The Night Voice (2016)

Sidestories

Tales from the World of the Saga of the Noble Dead

 Homeward
 Homeward (March 2014) by Barb Hendee — compendium edition containing "The Keepers", "The Reluctant Guardian", "Captives", "Claws", "The Sleeping Curse", "Silent Bells"
 The Game Piece (April 2012) by Barb Hendee
 The Feral Path (June 2012) by Barb Hendee
 The Sapphire (July 2012) by Barb Hendee
 The Keepers (August 2012) by Barb Hendee
 The Keepers
 Captives (April 2013) by Barb Hendee — Sequel to "The Keepers"
 Claws (June 2013) by Barb Hendee  — Sequel to "Captives"
 The Sleeping Curse (July 2013) 
 Silent Bells (August 2013) 
 The Reluctant Guardian (September 2012) by Barb Hendee

 Bones of the Earth
 Nameless (February 2015) by J.C. Hendee — compendium edition containing "Karras the Kitten", "Karras the Cat", "Karras the Nameless"
 Karras the Kitten (May 2012) by J.C. Hendee
 Karras the Cat (October 2012) by J.C. Hendee
 Karras the Nameless

 Tales of Misbelief
 The Forgotten Lord (February 2013) by Barb Hendee
 The Forgotten Mistress (September 2013) by Barb Hendee
 The Forgotten Village (June 2014) by Barb Hendee

 Sagecraft
 Puppy Love (June 2013) by J.C. Hendee

Spin-offs

 Codex of the Noble Dead (planned) by J.C. Hendee

 Mist Torn Witches series
 The Mist-Torn Witches (May 2013) by Barb Hendee
 The Witches in Red (May 6, 2014) by Barb Hendee
 Witches with the Enemy (5 May 2015) by Barb Hendee
 To Kill A Kettle Witch (May 2016) by Barb Hendee

Characters
Magiere
A dhampir (half-human half-vampire), protagonist and primary character of the saga as a whole.

Leesil (Leshil)
A half-human half-Elf (an'Croan), protagonist and primary character of the saga as a whole.

Chap
A fay-hound (majay-hi), protagonist and primary character of the saga as a whole.

Wynn Hygeorht
A human scholar (sage) as an additional character of the first series/phase and a protagonist of the saga as a whole as of the second series/phase.

Welstiel Massing
A vampire, main antagonist of the first series/phase in the saga.

Chane Andraso
A vampire, antagonist in the first series and a main character in the second series/phase and beyond in the saga.

Shade
A fay-hound (majay-hi), a main character of the second series/phase and beyond in the saga.

Ore-Locks Iron-Braid
A dwarf, a main character of the second series/phase of the saga.

References

External links
 Official website: NobleDead.org
 The Vampire Memories website (Barb Hendee) - BarbHendee.org

Fantasy novel series
Horror novel series
High fantasy novels